Varathan is a 2018 Indian Malayalam-language action thriller film directed by Amal Neerad. It is an adaptation of Straw Dogs. It was jointly produced by Nazriya Nazim and Amal Neerad under the banners of Fahadh Faasil and Friends and Amal Neerad Productions. It is written by Suhas-Sharfu and stars Fahadh Faasil and Aishwarya Lekshmi. The film was released on 20 September 2018.

Plot 
Varathan is a story about a husband and wife, Abin and Priya who return to Kerala from Dubai for a break in their job. They then decide to live at Priya's childhood-home in the hills. Since their first day there, Priya is suspicious of the intentions of the contractors who work on her family's land. The villagers and neighbours are often shown ogling at her. After their wedding anniversary, when the couple go to bed, Priya spots someone staring at them from the window. But when she wakes her husband, the shadow disappears. Next day, when Priya is about to take a bath, she spots a man staring at her through the window. She screams and Abin spots a worker in the upper terrain. He shuts the window with duct tape and newspaper. Priya is constantly seen warning Abin that people around there were not the same as in Bangalore or Dubai, so they ought to be more careful. Even an occasion occurs when Priya's inner wears are stolen by Jithin.

One day, Abin has to meet up with a designer regarding their startup and Priya is left alone at home. She promises to go to the convent after Abin goes. Priya locks the door and goes to the convent Library on her scooty. Although, midway she is hit by a Jeep with the malefic neighbours Josy, Johnny and their right hand man Jithin. While she lays unconscious,  they leave her in the hospital . When Abin returns home at night, he sees the house locked. He then goes out on a search for her when he gets a call from the caretaker of the estates, Benny, who informs him that Priya was hospitalized. When Aby reaches the hospital, Priya is furious. She fumes out of the hospital saying nothing. Aby tries to talk to her when they are on their way home, but Priya is agitated. She takes the key, walks into the house and starts packing her bags. When Abin starts to question her, Priya says she was sexually molested she no longer felt safe living with Abin up there in the hills or anywhere else.

Abin walks out and lights a cigarette standing at the front door. A boy and mother, whom Aby and Priya once gave lift to, comes crying to the house. They describe how the boy was caught with the Contractor's daughter Sandra in the bushes that day. They explain how the contractor family is looking to kill him. Abin tells the mother and son to go inside and locks the door. Two men, who work for the contractor comes inquiring about the boy. Abin says he doesn't know where the boy is. Unsatisfied, they return after noticing one of the boy's slippers on the verandah. However, a Jeep and multiple people including the Contractor and all his sons come to Abin's house. They ask for the boy and Abin says he won't let go of the boy. They can find him tomorrow at the Police Station.

None of the people withdraw, upon which Abin walks inside and tries to lock the door. When he is stopped by Johnny, Abin slides out a butcher's knife from the doorside and stabs his left forearm. He locks the door and walks Priya, the mother and the boy to a safe room.

From there, the movie takes an action-mode. Abin sets up the house to electrocute the invaders and successfully does so. Some others who try to invade the house are seen burned with torch flame and LPG gas cylinder, cleverly by Abin. After fighting tooth and nail until the morning, Abin is brutally hit in the head and captured by the contractor and josey. While they aim to shoot him with a gun, Priya walks out with the mother and the son as if in surrender. When they look towards her, Priya shoots two of the perpetrators. Abin, seeing the opportunity, takes charge. The contractor flees away and Abin brutally hits Josey, the last of his wife's abuser. And he informs that police will come & take them.

After chaos, he is seen drinking the coffee with Priya while he narrates Josey how law is still valid and alive in this part of the country. After that, an epilogue 'Two week Later' is seen where Abin locks the gate with a plaque on it saying 'Trespassers will be Shot'. They live happy life after.

Cast
Fahadh Faasil as Abin Mathew
Aishwarya Lekshmi as Priya Paul
Sharafudheen as Josephkutty
Dileesh Pothan as Benny
Mamitha Baiju as Sandra
Nisthar Sait
Arjun Ashokan as Jacob
 Vijilesh Karayad as Jithin
Shobi Thilakan
Chethan Jayalal as Preman
Unnimaya Prasad as Preman's mother
Parvathi T. as Priya's mother
Kochu Preman as Oanth
Jinu Joseph as Alex
Rosshan Chandra as Gymmen

Production
Besides directing, Amal Neerad co-produced the film with Nazriya Nazim, which stars her husband Fahadh Faasil alongside Aishwarya Lekshmi. Neerad revealed the film's title on 20 June 2018 by releasing the first poster. Varathan in Malayalam means "outsider" in English. Writer Suhas describes the film as a "survival thriller". Shot in Dubai and Wagamon, filming was completed by June 2018.

Soundtrack 

The music was composed, programmed and arranged by Sushin Shyam. Lyrics were penned by Vinayak Sasikumar.

Release 
The film was released on 20 September 2018.

Many of the critics remarked that the film is an unofficial adaptation of Straw Dogs.

Box office
The film was a commercial success. As of 5 October 2018, the film has grossed ₹22 crore worldwide, with ₹18 crore from Kerala alone. It grossed ₹1.06 crore from Bangalore in 12 days. As of October, it was the highest-grossing Malayalam film of that year in Bangalore. Varathan grossed a total of ₹33 crore worldwide at the end of its theatrical run.

Accolades

Notes

References

External links
 

2018 films
2010s Malayalam-language films
Home invasions in film
Indian thriller films
Films directed by Amal Neerad
Films scored by Sushin Shyam
Films shot in Dubai
2018 thriller films
Indian remakes of American films